A snack bar usually refers to an inexpensive food counter that is part of a permanent structure where snack foods and light meals are sold.

Description
A beach snack bar is often a small building situated high on the sand. Besides soft drinks, candies and chewing gum, some snack bars sell hot dogs, hamburgers, french fries, potato chips, corn chips and other foods. While this is usually the case, sometimes "snack bar" refers to a small café or cafeteria. Various small, casual dining establishments may be called "snack bars", including beverage and snack counters at movie theaters, and small delis. Many places with snack bars have a "No outside food or drink" policy to encourage sales.

In movie theaters and other types of theaters, the snack bar is located in the lobby.

The first known use of the word "snack bar" was in 1930.

Similar entities
Snack bar may also refer to:

A Japanese hostess bar
A small café or "greasy spoon" style restaurant
A concession stand, which can be found in a variety of locations such as beach, cinema, and other entertainment venues
A food cart, mobile kitchen or food truck
An ice cream van
A tapas bar
A lunch counter
A tuck shop

References

External links

Restaurants by type
Types of drinking establishment

de:Imbiss#Verkaufsstand